Ross Corner is a community in the Canadian province of Nova Scotia, located in  Kings County.

Communities in Kings County, Nova Scotia